Bhagyanagara Veedullo Gamattu is a 2019 Indian Telugu-language comedy drama film directed and co-produced by Srinivasa Reddy in his directorial debut. The film stars himself and comedians Satya and Shakalaka Shankar.

Plot 
The film follows three aspiring filmmakers (Srinu, Jojo, and Peter) who get caught up in a drug mafia.

Cast 

 Srinivasa Reddy as Srinu 
 Satya as Jojo
 Shakalaka Shankar as Peter
 Vennela Kishore as a police officer
 Dolly Shah
 Satyam Rajesh
 Viva Harsha
 Chitram Seenu
 Hyper Aadi as Mahesh
 Praveen
 Jhansi as Batuku Edla Bandi anchor
 Suman Shetty
 Raghu Babu
 Racha Ravi

Production 
Popular comedian Srinivasa Reddy makes his directorial debut with this film. The first look was revealed on 28 September 2019.

Soundtrack 
Music composed by Saketh Komanduri.
"Vethiki Vethiki" - Dinker Kalvala
"Hip Hop" - Saketh, Deepu, Sri Krishna
"Prema Rojuke Banthi" - Rahul Sipligunj, Harika Narayan

Release 
The Times of India gave the film one-and-a-half out of five stars and wrote that " Most of the characters in the film come and go as they please, making the film an avoidable fare".

References 

2019 films
2010s Telugu-language films
Indian comedy-drama films
2019 comedy films